Flickia is an ammonite genus from the Upper Albian stage of the Early Cretaceous.

Description
Flickia is a very small ammonite. Its shell varied in shape from subevolute to subinvolute. It was narrow, smooth, and had a rounded venter. Despite belonging to the most advanced order of ammonites, its suture was more similar to that of Goniatites and other primitive ammonites.

References

 Murray, John W. Atlas of Invertebrate Macrofossils. New York: Wiley, 1985. Print. 
 Flickia at Fossilworks

Ammonitida genera
Acanthoceratoidea